Idris Nuradeen (born 15 January 2002) is a Nigerian professional footballer who plays for Smorgon on loan from BATE Borisov.

References

External links 
 
 
 Profile at BATE Borisov website

2002 births
Living people
Sportspeople from Kaduna
Nigerian footballers
Association football forwards
Nigerian expatriate footballers
Expatriate footballers in Belarus
Nigerian expatriate sportspeople in Belarus
FC BATE Borisov players
FC Smorgon players
FC Arsenal Dzerzhinsk players